Hutchinson Municipal Airport , also known as Butler Field, is a public airport located two miles (3 km) south of the central business district of Hutchinson, a city in McLeod County, Minnesota, United States. It is owned by the City of Hutchinson. The airport is home to the Civil Air Patrol. The FBO is operated by ASI JET.

Although most U.S. airports use the same three-letter location identifier for the FAA and IATA, Hutchinson Municipal Airport is assigned HCD by the FAA but has no designation from the IATA.

Facilities and aircraft 
For the 12-month period ending July 31, 2007, the airport had 12,395 aircraft operations, an average of 33 per day: 98% general aviation, 2% air taxi and <1% military.

References

External links 
  at Minnesota DOT Airport Directory

Airports in Minnesota
Buildings and structures in McLeod County, Minnesota
Transportation in McLeod County, Minnesota